Pedabondapalli (or Pedabondapalle) is a village/Gram panchayat in Parvathipuram mandal, Vizianagaram district, Andhra Pradesh, India.

It's the second largest village in Parvathipuram town by population.

Geography
Pedabondapalli is situated in Vizianagaram District, Andhra Pradesh with 18.752129 Latitude and 83.375586 Longitude.
It has an average elevation of 120 metres (396 feet). It is located at a distance of 7 km from Parvathipuram.

Demographics
 India census, Pedabondapalli had a population of 4850.

References

External links
 Pedabondapalle village on OurVillageIndia
 Pedabondapalli on Wikimapia

Villages in Vizianagaram district